The 1920 Michigan gubernatorial election was held on November 2, 1920. Republican nominee Alex J. Groesbeck defeated Democratic nominee Woodbridge N. Ferris with 66.43% of the vote.

General election

Candidates
Major party candidates
Alex J. Groesbeck, Republican
Woodbridge N. Ferris, Democratic 
Other candidates
Benjamin Blumenberg, Socialist
J. Jeffries, Farmer-Labor
Faith Johnston, Prohibition
E. R. Markley, Socialist Labor

Results

Primaries

Democratic Primary

Republican Primary

References

1920
Michigan
Gubernatorial
November 1920 events in the United States